The Al Alam Palace ("Palace of the Flag") is a palace located in Old Muscat, Oman. It was used as a ceremonial palace by Sultan Qaboos bin Said Al Said.

History
Al Alam Palace, one of six residences of the sultan, has a history of over 200 years, and was built under the watch of Imam Sultan bin Ahmed, the 7th direct great grandfather of Sultan Haitham. The existing palace, which has a facade of gold and blue, was rebuilt as a royal residence in 1972. The inner grounds of the palace remain off-limits, but members of the public are permitted to stop near the gates and take photographs. Al Alam Palace is surrounded by the Mirani and Jalali Forts built in the 16th century by the Portuguese.

The Palace is used for official functions and receives distinguished visitors. In January 2012, the sultan received Queen Beatrix of the Netherlands at the Al Alam Palace during her state visit to Oman.

Architecture
Author Peter J. Ochs wrote: "When you visit the main gates of Al Alam Palace, it is unlike any other capital you will ever visit. The palace itself is elegant but humble in design, unlike the grandiose structures of other capitals". Elegantly designed, it features many highly polished marble surfaces. Government buildings in the vicinity are white, with crenellated rooftops and wooden balconies in the traditional Omani style. Though primarily a ceremonial palace, there is a guest villa at the palace with its own pool, spa and walled gardens.

Gallery

See also
 Royal Guard of Oman
 List of palaces

References

Buildings and structures completed in 1972
Palaces in Oman
Omani monarchy
Buildings and structures in Muscat, Oman
Tourist attractions in Muscat, Oman
Old Muscat